Gong Sung-jin (born April 20, 1953) is a member of the Grand National Party (also known as the Hannara Party) in South Korea, representing the Gangnam District of Seoul. 
He was born in Seoul on April 20, 1953.

Education 
After graduating from Kyunggi High School in Seoul, he attended Yonsei University majoring in political science. He continued his education at Claremont Graduate University, California in the United States and received his master's degree and PhD in 1986.

Career 
Gong Sung-Jin was elected from Gangnam District of Seoul at 2004, in the 17th General election. As a legislative career, he has worked in the Environment & Labor Committee, the National Defense Committee, the Intelligence Committee, and the Committee for Peaceful Reunification. He has held various posts in the Grand National Party as the chairman of the 1st Policy Coordination Committee, joint chairman of the National Development Strategy Research and so on. In the 17th presidential election, Gong served as chairman of the election campaign committee in Seoul. Later he was appointed as chairman of the GNP Seoul Branch in September 2007.

At the presidential election in December 2007, he decisively contributed to candidate Lee Myung-Bak's victory as the director-general of the Grand National Party presidential election campaign office in Seoul. He was reelected at the general election on April 9, 2008 and was elected as a Supreme Committee Member of the Grand National Party on July 3, 2008. He is now working as member of the National Policy Committee of the National Assembly and one of the most prominent politicians of the ruling Grand National Party.

 1992 - 2004. President of Hanbek Foundation
 1999 - 2001. Served as a member of Millennium Committee of JoongAng Ilbo
 1999 - 2000. Served as advisor for Future Talks 2000 of Educational Broadcasting System (EBS)
 1997 - 1999. Served as visiting scholar at Claremont McKenna College for "The Keck Center for International and Strategic Studies"
 1997 - 1999. Served as columnist of Korea Broadcasting System.
 1999. Served as advisor of a coordinating committee for Expo 2012
 1995 - 1998. Served as advisor on the Reunification Issue for Munhwa Broadcasting Corporation
 1989 - 1997. Served as chief editor & publisher for a quarterly magazine, the Forum 21
 1989 - 1992. Served as an executive Member of Korean Political Science Association
 of Korean association for Public Administration
 of Korean Society of Phenomenology
 of Korean Society of Futurology

Books  
 The Future of Korea and the World (1991)
 21st Century Korea and Korean (1993)
 Sense of Wholeness and Human Rights (1993)
 Foreseen Unified Koreas (1994)
 The Politics of Korea (1995)
 Dreams with Open Eyes (1996)
 Future Challenges of Local Autonomy in Japan, Korea and the United States (1997)
 Changing World, Changing Occupations (2000)
 Security Strategy of Korea. 2008~2013 (2008)

External links 
 Homepage

1953 births
Living people
Liberty Korea Party politicians
Members of the National Assembly (South Korea)
Gong clan of Qufu